Adolphe Thomegeux was a French fencer. He competed in the individual épée event at the 1900 Summer Olympics. In the first round he didn't qualify for the quarter finals. His brother Pierre Thomegeux was also a fencer who competed in the individual épée event at the 1900 Summer Olympics.

References

External links

Year of birth missing
Year of death missing
French male épée fencers
Olympic fencers of France
Fencers at the 1900 Summer Olympics
Place of birth missing
Place of death missing